98FM usually refers to Dublin's 98FM, a radio station in Ireland. 

98FM may refer to these radio stations using 98MHz:

 Lisburn's 98FM
 WKCQ
 WDZH, also known as "98-7 Amp Radio".